Romain Duport (born 10 December 1986) is a French professional basketball player for Champagne Châlons-Reims Basket of the French League.

Amateur career
Born in Angers, France, Duport developed his basketball abilities through the Youth academies of Cholet Basket, Angers BC 49 and mainly STB Le Havre. With the Youth team of STB Le Havre, he won the French Pro A Youth team championship in 2007 and was named in the All French Pro A Youth First Team.

Professional career
Romain Duport started its professional debuts with Le Havre in the 2004-05 season making one appearance on the court. His minutes with the professional team slowly increased through the seasons up to 17 minutes in the 2009-2010 season. However, he suffered injuries and played only 9 games with Le Havre for his last season with the club. For the 2010-2011 season, he joined the 2010 French champion Cholet Basket. He was mainly selected due to its rare height (7'1) in French Pro A championship and to allow Cholet Basket to have a real Big Man in its roster to play against other centers of the Euroleague.

On 7 September 2016 Duport signed with Limoges CSP.

Notes

External links
 Romain Duport profile on LNB.fr
 Romain Duport profile  on Cholet Basket website

1986 births
Living people
Champagne Châlons-Reims Basket players
Cholet Basket players
French men's basketball players
SIG Basket players
Sportspeople from Angers
STB Le Havre players
Centers (basketball)